Edward Phillips (1630–c. 1696) was an English author.

Edward, Eddie, Ed, or Ted Phillips or Philips may also refer to:

Arts and entertainment
Eddie Phillips (actor) (1899–1965), American actor
Edward O. Phillips (born 1931), Canadian novelist
Eddie Phillips (musician) (born 1942), British musician
Ed Phillips (born 1966), Australian TV-radio presenter

Sports

Baseball
Eddie Phillips (catcher) (1901–1968), American baseball catcher
Eddie Phillips (pinch runner) (1931–2010), American baseball player for the St. Louis Cardinals
Ed Phillips (pitcher) (1944–2017), American baseball player for the Boston Red Sox

Cricket
Edward Phillips (cricketer, born 1851), Australian cricketer
Edward Phillips (cricketer, born 1883) (1883–1915), Welsh cricketer
Edward Phillips (cricketer, born 1892), Australian cricketer

Other sports
Eddie Phillips (boxer) (1911–1995), English boxer
Eddie Phillips (Australian footballer) (born 1931), Australian rules footballer for Footscray
Ted Phillips (footballer) (1933–2018), English professional footballer
Eddie Phillips (basketball) (born 1961), American basketball player
Eddie Phillips (quarterback) (fl. 1969–1971), American football quarterback
Ted Phillips (fl. 1984–present), American football executive
Ed Phillips (footballer) (born 1998), Australian rules footballer for St Kilda

Others
Edward Phillips (British Army officer) (1889–1973), British World War II general and medical officer
Edward H. Phillips (fl. 1980s–present), American aviator and aviation historian
Edward "Ted" Philips (born 1983), American politician in Massachusetts

See also
Edward Phelips (disambiguation)